Transvolga Region or Transvolga (Zavolzhye) is a territory to the East of Volga River bounded by Volga, Ural Mountains,  Northern Ridge, and Caspian Depression.

The region is traditionally subdivided into the elevated High Transvolga (Высокое Заволжье) in the East and the lowland Low Transvolga (Низкое Заволжье) by the left bank of Volga between Kazan and Kamyshin. 

The region includes Volga-Ural petroleum and gas province.

Kuybyshev Reservoir is within the Low Transvolga.

See also
Volga Region

Regions of Russia
Volga basin